The Central District of Tiran and Karvan County is a district (bakhsh) in Tiran and Karvan County, Isfahan Province, Iran. At the 2006 census, its population was 32,917, in 9,407 families.  The District has two cities: Tiran and Rezvanshahr. The District has two rural districts (dehestan): Rezvaniyeh Rural District and Var Posht Rural District.

References 

Tiran and Karvan County
Districts of Isfahan Province